Thujopsene is a natural chemical compound, classified as a sesquiterpene, with the molecular formula C15H24.

Thujopsene is found in the essential oil of a variety of conifers,  in particular Juniperus cedrus and Thujopsis dolabrata in which it comprises around 2.2% of the weight of the heartwood.

Biosynthesis
Thujopsene is biosynthesized from farnesyl pyrophosphate (FPP):

References

Hydrocarbons
Sesquiterpenes
Cyclopropanes
Tricyclic compounds